The 1896 United States presidential election in Maine took place on November 3, 1896, as part of the 1896 United States presidential election. Voters chose six representatives, or electors to the Electoral College, who voted for president and vice president.

Maine voted for the Republican nominee, former governor of Ohio William McKinley, over the Democratic nominee, former U.S. Representative from Nebraska William Jennings Bryan. McKinley won the state by a margin of 38.69%.

Bryan, running on a platform of free silver, appealed strongly to Western miners and farmers, but had little appeal in the Northeastern states such as Maine.

With 67.90% of the popular vote, Maine would be McKinley's fifth strongest victory in terms of percentage in the popular vote after Vermont, Massachusetts, neighboring New Hampshire and Rhode Island.

Results

Results by county

See also
 United States presidential elections in Maine

References

Maine
1896
1896 Maine elections